Anthony or Tony Byrne is the name of:

 Anthony Byrne (pianist) (born 1958), Irish concert pianist
 Anthony Byrne (politician) (born 1962), Australian politician
 Tony Byrne (boxer) (1930–2013), Irish boxer
 Tony Byrne (footballer, born 1940), Irish footballer for Shamrock Rovers
 Tony Byrne (footballer, born 1946) (1946–2016), Irish footballer of Southampton, Hereford and Newport County
 Tony Byrne, Irish poker player who won the Irish Poker Open in 1984
 Tony Byrne, US software analyst founder of Real Story Group

See also
 Anthony Burns (disambiguation)